The 1881 New York state election was held on November 8, 1881, to elect the Secretary of State, the State Comptroller, the Attorney General, the State Treasurer, the State Engineer and a judge of the New York Court of Appeals, as well as all members of the New York State Assembly and the New York State Senate.

Nominations
The Greenback-Labor state convention met on August 24 at Elmira, New York. Mr. Furbish was Temporary and Permanent Chairman. All candidates were nominated by acclamation.

The Prohibition state convention met on September 15 at Utica, New York and nominated Stephen Merritt for Secretary of State; Jefferson Bissell, of Steuben County, for Comptroller; Frederick Gates for Treasurer; George Brooks, of Otsego County, for Attorney General; John J. Hooker, of Tioga County, for State Engineer; and Walter Farrington for Judge of the Court of Appeals.

The Republican state convention met on October 5. The incumbent Secretary of State Joseph B. Carr was re-nominated by acclamation. Ira Davenport was nominated for Comptroller on the first ballot (vote: Davenport 290, Henry L. Duguid 191). Leslie W. Russell was nominated for Attorney General on the first ballot (vote: Russell 255, Hamilton Ward, Sr. [incumbent] 231). James W. Husted was nominated for Treasurer during the first ballot. Ex-State Engineer Silas Seymour (in office 1856-1857) was nominated again for this office, and Francis M. Finch, who had been appointed to the Court of Appeals to fill the vacancy caused by the election of Charles J. Folger as Chief Judge, was nominated to succeed himself, both by acclamation.

The Democratic state convention met on October 11 and 12 at Albany, New York. The Tammany delegates were not admitted and left the convention. Erastus Brooks was chosen Permanent Chairman. William Purcell, of Rochester, was nominated for Secretary of State on the first ballot (vote: Purcell 258, Charles Hughes 96, R. S. Stevens 14). George H. Lapham, of Yates County, was nominated for Comptroller by acclamation. Roswell A. Parmenter, of Troy, was nominated for Attorney General on the first ballot (vote: Parmenter 221, James W. Covert 57, J. Thomas Spriggs 55, Ruggles 21, Lewis L. Bundy 16). Robert A. Maxwell was nominated after the roll was, amid some confusion, called twice for the first ballot (vote Maxwell 197, H. Catlin 187). Thomas Evershed, of Orleans County, was nominated for State Engineer by a rising vote. Augustus Schoonmaker, Jr., was nominated for the Court of Appeals during the first ballot when the name of William C. Ruger was withdrawn.

Results
Almost the whole Republican ticket was elected. Only Robert A. Maxwell managed to be elected on the Democratic ticket.

The incumbents Carr and Finch were re-elected.

Notes

Sources
Result for Secretary of State: THE NOVEMBER ELECTIONS in NYT on November 5, 1883 (recalling the previous result)
Result for Rep., Dem., and Howe: OFFICIAL VOTE FOR STATE OFFICERS AS CANVASSED BY THE COUNTY SUPERVISORS in NYT on November 27, 1881
Result: The Tribune Almanac 1882

See also
New York state elections

1881
1881 New York (state) elections